TRFM (Callsign: 3TFM) is a commercial radio station broadcasting from Traralgon, Victoria, Australia. It is currently owned by Ace Radio & broadcasts A Contemporary Hits Radio (CHR) format. It features both locally produced content & nationally syndicated content from both NOVA Entertainment & Grant Broadcasters. They have a repeater on Mount Taylor, near Bairnsdale, to better cover East Gippsland.

History 
The station began life in Trafalgar as 3TR, being an abbreviation for 3 Trafalgar Radio. It has since moved studio locations several times and has been based in Trafalgar, Sale, and Traralgon. The station was founded by Frank Berkery, and later from 1934 to 1938 was owned by Archibald Gilchrist.

The original 3TR studios in Sale are now used by ABC Gippsland. These studios were officially opened by then Prime Minister Robert Menzies on Saturday 29 April 1939 and the program was then relayed across the Victorian Broadcast Network (made up of 3SH and 3HA at the time) to which it then belonged.

For the most of the station's life it operated on the AM band, most recently at 1242 kHz. On Friday 26 April 2002 at midday the station officially became 3TR FM. For the previous week it was simulcasting on both AM and FM after test transmissions. Also at midday, sister station 3GV (now known as Gold 1242) commenced on 1242 kHz.

In other markets where Ace Radio have set up supplementary FM stations they have launched a new FM station (generally under the Mixx FM brand) and kept the existing AM station broadcasting as usual with its existing name. However it was decided to transfer the 3TR brand name to FM in an attempt to retain 3TR's existing listener base and instead start a new station on 1242 kHz. Also the format of 1242 3TR in the years prior to the transfer to FM was very similar to the format 3TR FM carried making more sense to keep the 3TR brand name on the new FM station.

In September 2008 the station dropped the "3" from its name and is now known as TRFM.

References

External links 

Ace Radio website

Ace Radio
Contemporary hit radio stations in Australia
Radio stations established in 1939
Radio stations in Victoria